Timocratica xanthosoma is a moth in the family Depressariidae. It was described by Paul Dognin in 1913. It is found in Panama, Colombia and French Guiana.

The wingspan is about 35 mm. The forewings are snow white and the hindwings are white.

Subspecies
Timocratica xanthosoma xanthosoma (French Guiana)
Timocratica xanthosoma leucocephala Becker, 1982 (Panama, Colombia)

References

Moths described in 1913
Timocratica